Montagu is a town in the Western Cape province of South Africa, about  from Cape Town in the Western Little Karoo. It is named after former secretary of the Cape Colony, John Montagu, but was once known as Agter Cogman's Kloof, Cogman's Kloof linking the town and railway station. It is situated at the confluence of the Keisie and Kingna rivers.

Montagu was founded on the farm "Uitvlugt" in 1851, and is known for its hot mineral springs and scenic mountains. It is also an agricultural centre, where orchards and vineyards are in production and local herbs are grown. The farming area, 'Koo', lies north of the town and is famous for the quality of its apples, pears, apricots and peaches. The author Francis Brett Young spent his final years here. Nearby rock formations make it one of the country's major rock climbing venues. The 1266 m high Bloupunt peak overlooks the village and offers several hiking trails, as well as kloofing and mountain biking trails further afield.

Montagu is near the Robertson Wine Valley, and is most easily reached via the Route 62 scenic route.

See also 
 Montagu Museum
 Montagu Pass

References

External links 

 
 

Climbing areas of South Africa
Hot springs of South Africa
Populated places established in 1856
Populated places in the Langeberg Local Municipality
1856 establishments in the Cape Colony